Private First Class Ralph Ellis Dias (July 15, 1950 – November 12, 1969) was a United States Marine who posthumously received the Medal of Honor for heroism in Vietnam in November 1969.

Biography
Ralph Dias, a Mexican-American, was born on July 15, 1950, in Indiana County, Pennsylvania. He graduated from elementary school in 1965, then attended Elderton Joint High School in Elderton, Pennsylvania, for two years.

He enlisted in the United States Marine Corps on October 9, 1967, at Pittsburgh, Pennsylvania, and underwent recruit training with the 2nd Recruit Training Battalion, Marine Corps Recruit Depot Parris Island, South Carolina.

Upon completion of recruit training in December, he was transferred to the 2nd Infantry Training Battalion, 1st Infantry Training Regiment, Camp Lejeune, North Carolina, for special infantry training. In February 1968, he was ordered to the Marine Corps Base, Camp Pendleton, California, for duty with Company B, 1st Battalion 28th Marines, 5th Marine Division.

In April 1969, he was ordered to the Republic of Vietnam for duty as a rifleman with Company D, 1st Battalion, 7th Marines, 1st Marine Division, Fleet Marine Force.

His medals and decorations include: the Medal of Honor, the Purple Heart, the Combat Action Ribbon, the Meritorious Unit Commendation with one bronze star, the National Defense Service Medal, the Vietnam Service Medal with three bronze stars, the Republic of Vietnam Meritorious Unit Commendation (Gallantry Cross Color) with palm and frame, the Republic of Vietnam Meritorious Unit Commendation (Civil Action Medal, First Class Color) with palm and frame, and the Republic of Vietnam Campaign Medal with device.

Private Dias was killed in action on November 12, 1969, while participating in combat in Quảng Nam Province.  His heroic actions on that date were recognized with his nation's highest military honor — the Medal of Honor.  He is buried in Oakdale Cemetery, Leetonia, Ohio.

Medal of Honor citation

Awards and decorations
Dias' awards include:

Legacy
The name Ralph E. Dias is inscribed on the Vietnam Veterans Memorial ("The Wall") on  Panel 16W, Line 063. A section of state rt 344 in Leetonia has been renamed in his honor.
More information may be found at http://www.morningjournalnews.com/page/content.detail/id/511243/A-day-for-Dias.html.

See also

List of Medal of Honor recipients
List of Hispanic Medal of Honor recipients
List of Medal of Honor recipients for the Vietnam War
Hispanics in the United States Marine Corps

Notes

References

1950 births
1969 deaths
United States Marine Corps Medal of Honor recipients
United States Marines
American military personnel killed in the Vietnam War
People from Indiana County, Pennsylvania
Vietnam War recipients of the Medal of Honor
United States Marine Corps personnel of the Vietnam War